'W' Robertson (full name unrecorded) was a Scottish footballer who played as a forward for Sheffield United.

Playing career
Reported as 'hailing from' Dundee, Robertson was one of a number of Scots who travelled South to sign for Sheffield United in 1889 following the club's advertisements for players published in the Scottish press earlier that year. Signed by the club following a trail, Robertson played in all of United's first 84 games although the majority of these were friendly fixtures. He also scored the club's first goal (in their first ever fixture against Notts Rangers in September 1889), was the first player to score a hat-trick for the club (October 1889 against Sheffield Exchange) and was the first United player to be sent off (March 1890 against Rotherham Town.)

During the club's second season Robertson played fewer and fewer games and was released in the summer of 1891 although there were no contemporary reports in the local media as to what happened to him after that.

Post playing career
It was reported in 1908 that Robertson was then residing in Haileybury in Ontario, Canada where he was coaching football.

References

Footballers from Dundee
Association football forwards
Scottish footballers
Sheffield United F.C. players
Year of birth missing
19th-century Scottish people
Midland Football League players